Abbots Wood Junction railway station was an early railway station in England, close to Worcester. Originally named Worcester Junction, it was renamed Abbot's Wood Junction on 1 March 1852, and it was closed on 1 October 1855.

The railway junction, still extant, was created , when the Oxford, Worcester and Wolverhampton Railway reached the Bristol and Gloucester Railway just outside Worcester, forming a connection.

References

Disused railway stations in Worcestershire
Former Midland Railway stations
Railway stations in Great Britain opened in 1850
Railway stations in Great Britain closed in 1855